Bezerros is a municipality in northeastern Brazil, in the State of Pernambuco, near the city of Gravatá. Its population was 60,880 (2020) and its area is 491 km2. Also known as Papangu city, because a festive tradition in which the people dress masks of all types during the Carnival festivities. During the carnival time, it is one of the most visited cities in the interior of the state. Also, it was a center of coffee production, an activity which is no longer important in the region. It is much visited during Carnival; tourists and locals love to see papangus parading in city streets.

Geography

 State - Pernambuco
 Region - Agreste of Pernambuco
 Boundaries - Cumaru and Passira  (N); Agrestina and São Joaquim do Monte  (S); Caruaru and Riacho das Almas (W); Gravatá, Camocim de São Félix  and Sairé (E)
 Area - 490.8 km2
 Elevation - 470 m
 Hydrography - Capibaribe, Ipojuca and Una rivers
 Climate -  Hot tropical and humid
 Main road -  BR 232
 Distance to Recife - 100 km

Tourist attractions
 Serra Negra
 Igreja de São Francisco Xavier, Serra Negra, Bezerros, Pernambuco, Brasil
 Sítio Pedra Solta, camping area, planning on visiting jungle areas: here is the place, rappel
 Lula Vassoureiro's Atelier
 Centro de Artesanato de Pernambuco - Handicraft center
 J. Borges' atelier, a great woodcut artist and one of the greatest Cordel makers of Brazil.
 J. Miguel' atelier, a great woodcut artist and also a Cordel maker.
 Papangu Carnival

Economy

The main activities based in Bezerros are tourism, commerce and agribusiness. Especially, plantations of tomatoes and creations of cattle'

Economic Indicators

Economy by Sector
2006

Health Indicators

References

External links

Site Of Bezerros Brazil Travel

Municipalities in Pernambuco